The Copa América is South America's major tournament in senior men's soccer and determines the continental champion. Until 1967, the tournament was known as South American Championship. It is the oldest continental championship in the world.

Qatar are not members of the South American football confederation CONMEBOL. But because CONMEBOL only has ten member associations, guest nations have been invited since 2019

Record at the Copa América
Qatar was the second team from outside the Americas to participate in the Copa América, and was invited for the first time in 2019.

2019 Copa América

Paraguay vs Qatar

Colombia vs Qatar

Qatar vs Argentina

References

External links
RSSSF archives and results
Soccerway database

Countries at the Copa América
Qatar national football team